Devario laoensis is a species of danionin, a group of small minnow-type fish belonging to the family Cyprinidae.  They are native to the fresh waters of Southeast Asia.

References

External links
 Devario laoensis

Devario
Fish of Southeast Asia
Fish of Thailand
Fish described in 1940